Reyanna Maria Cuevas (born June 3, 2001), is a Filipino-Australian singer, rapper, and songwriter. She is best known for her 2021 single, "So Pretty", and it's remix featuring American rapper Tyga.

Career 
After covering some of her favorite artists for some time and gaining a large following on the Chinese social media platform TikTok, Maria shared her first track So Pretty in 2021 for a TikTok duet challenge. The sound clip eventually caught major traction on the platform, garnering more than 20 million views with over a million users using the clip for the challenge, including the likes of James Charles, Alicia Keys, and Chrissy Teigen. American rapper Tyga sent the clip to record executive Steven Victor, who signed Reyanna to his record label Victor Victor Worldwide and Republic Records. Maria later released the remix of her track featuring Tyga. She is reportedly working on her debut EP.

References

21st-century Filipino women singers
Australian TikTokers
21st-century Australian women singers
Australian people of Filipino descent
Australian women singer-songwriters
Australian hip hop musicians
Australian hip hop singers
2001 births
Living people